Perarella is a genus of hydrozoans belonging to the family Cytaeididae.

The species of this genus are found in Europe, northwestern Africa, Antarctica.

Species:

Perarella abyssicola 
Perarella affinis 
Perarella clavata 
Perarella fallax 
Perarella parastichopae 
Perarella propagulata 
Perarella schneideri 
Perarella spongicola

References

Cytaeididae
Hydrozoan genera